Horace Alton White (July 24, 1907 - February 10, 1958) was a church leader and state legislator in Michigan. He served in the Michigan House of Representatives in 1941 and 1942.
He was noted for his strong anti violence position and his efforts in stopping the 1943 race riots. 

He was born in Cave Spring, Georgia. He received his Doctor of Divinity in 1941 from Wilberforce University whilst a member of the legislator. He received his A.B. degree from Ohio Wesleyan University in 1946.

He died Monday February 10, 1958 survived by Juanita his wife and their three sons Peter, John and Alton and their daughter Ceilia.

See also
Detroit race riot of 1943
List of African-American officeholders (1900–1959)

References

1907 births
1958 deaths
Members of the Michigan House of Representatives